Joseph J. D'Auria (born May 18, 1952) is an American actor, best known for his role as Bozo the Clown in The Bozo Show, succeeding original actor Bob Bell. He is also known as J.W. Terry, Joseph J. Terry, and Joseph W. Terry.

Biography
New York City native Joey D'Auria is best known for his role in WGN-TV Chicago's The Bozo Show from 1984 to 2001. D'Auria was hired after a long search for the next Bozo in part because his improvisational skills were very good. D'Auria also blended well with Roy Brown, who said he knew right away that D'Auria would be a hit after telling him he had broken his arm in three places and getting a response of, "Then don't go in those three places!" D'Auria played Bozo until the show's cancellation in 2001.

Roles

Animated cartoon voice roles
 Betsy's Kindergarten Adventures – Mr. Twilly (the postman)
 Daigunder – Commissioner Spinklestarber
 Digimon Tamers – Chuchidarumon Elder
 Digimon Frontier – Burgermon
 Funny Face Gang – Loudmouth Lime, Captain Black Cherry
 Ghost in the Shell 2: Innocence – Kim
 Kyo Kara Maoh – Louis Vuillon
 Little Angels - Gabriel
 Lupin the 3rd: The Mystery of Mamo – Stuckey (credited under the name of "Osgood W. Glick")
 The Mr. Men Show – Mr. Per(s)nickety/Mr. Fussy (US only), Mr. Scatterbrain, Mr. Rude, Narrator (US only) (credited under the name "Joseph J. Terry")
 Space Racers – Vulture, Coot (credited under the name "Joseph J. Terry")
 Stan Lee's The Condor – Assorted Voices
 The Jungle Book - Kaa, Akela, Masha (season 1-2; credited under the name "Joseph J. Terry")
 The Loud House - Buzz (in "Haunted House Call"), Male Employee (in "Haunted House Call")
 The Tom and Jerry Show – Butch, Droopy Dog, Additional voices
 Tom and Jerry in New York – Butch, Additional voices 
 Yo-Kai Watch – Whisper, Robonyan, Additional voices (credited under the name "J.W. Terry" only for the first season)

Live action film roles
 State of the Nation 2:Heroes of the Mancism - Dracaphanto, the voice of Mask of Guo Xiang, Winston Churchill

Live action television
 The Bozo Show – Bozo the Clown
 The Bozo Super Sunday Show – Bozo the Clown, the voice of Hurlie Hippo
 The Gong Show (1976–1980 series) – Doctor Flamo
 How I Met Your Mother – Fred
 To Tell the Truth – Contestant (2019)
 Let's Make a Deal – Contestant (2019)

Film roles
 A Turtle's Tale 2: Sammy's Escape from Paradise – Moray Eel Philippe (credited under the name "Joseph W. Terry")
 The Butler Did It – Mr. Starky
 Charming – Mr. Bloodpool
 Curious George – Assorted Voices
 Godmother May I – Richard
 The Greatest Story Of All Time – Zedediah
 Pickle Power – Mr. Grondower
 Play Ball  – Umpire
 Strung Out – Uncle Sid
 The Three Putz – Benny
 The Toy Warrior – Gramps

Video game roles
 Blue Dragon – Hineto, Lago Village Chief, Talta Village Chief
 Ratchet & Clank Future: A Crack in Time – Alister Azimuth, Mack Mackeroy
 BioShock Infinite – Salesmen, Additional Voices

Theatre
 The Proposal – Chubukov, ARTA, Los Angeles (2001)
 Arden Texas – Warden/Old Man/Deputy Red, The Colony Theater, Burbank (2003)
 Laughter on the 23rd Floor – Max Prince, The Briar St Theater, Chicago (1995); The Long Beach Playhouse (2005)
  Beauty and the Beast – Maurice, La Mirada Theatre for the Performing Arts (2019)

Commercials
 Coronetto Ice Cream – Scientist (2003)
 Cingular Wireless – Santa (2005)
 Taco Bueno (Train Time) – Uncle Tim (2006)

References

External links
 Official website of Joey D'Auria
 My Favorite Comedy Sketches by Joey D'Auria official website
 Joey D'Auria NPR Interview

Watch
Bozo 25th Anniversary 1986. Museum of Broadcast Communications (Windows Media Player)

1952 births
Living people
20th-century American male actors
21st-century American male actors
American clowns
American male film actors
American male stage actors
American male television actors
American male video game actors
American male voice actors
Bozo the Clown
Male actors from New York City